William Theodore deWit, Q.C. (born June 13, 1961) is a Justice of the Court of Queen's Bench of Alberta sitting in Calgary since 2017. Previously, he was a criminal defence lawyer and a professional boxer. He represented Canada at the 1984 Summer Olympics and won a silver medal in the heavyweight division. DeWit and teammate Shawn O'Sullivan were heavily touted going into the Games, as both had won the world championship.

Early years

DeWit played football in high school and was an all-star quarterback. He was offered a scholarship to the University of Alberta, but decided to quit football after he began learning how to box at a Grande Prairie health club which was run by a man named Jim Murrie. Impressed with his dedication and size, Murrie introduced deWit to Dr. Harry Snatic, a dentist and rancher who had been a youth boxing coach in Louisiana before moving his family in 1971 to Beaverlodge, a small town near Grande Prairie. He worked out with deWit three times a week, first in the health club, and then in the deWit's unheated garage where temperatures would often get to 10 or 20 degrees below zero.

Amateur boxing career
DeWit's first fight came at the Alberta provincial championships in March of 1979 in Medicine Hat. Snatic entered deWit in the light heavyweight intermediate novice division for boxers age 17 to 20 with less than 10 fights. DeWit knocked out his first opponent in 20 seconds which caused the coaches of the six other fighters in the division to pull their fighters. DeWit had won his first championship. Snatic then entered deWit in the British Columbia Golden Gloves championships where he fought 18-year-old Shane Anderson who was the western Canadian 178-pound champion and a veteran of about 40 fights. DeWit lost by decision, but he did beat Anderson in two of three return matches. In the last of those bouts, deWit knocked out Anderson, who never fought again.

Snatic then took deWit to fight at the Washington State Penitentiary where he knocked out his opponent in the opening minute of the first round.  Afterwards in April 1982, Snatic decided to sell his ranch and moved to Calgary. deWit went with him in order to find sparring partners, and to train with a Ugandan exile named Mansoor Esmail, who was Calgary's top boxing coach, and was considered a physical conditioning genius.

DeWit's first major victory came in Las Vegas in June 1982 when he knocked out Cuba's Pedro Cardenas to win his first North American title. Then he won gold at the Commonwealth Games, taking him a total of three minutes and 12 seconds to knock out three opponents. In March 1983 he defeated Alexander Yagubkin of the U.S.S.R. to win the world title. Then, in September 1983 he defended his North American title against highly touted Cuban Aurelio Toyo.

Leading up to the 1984 Olympics, a benefit in Calgary featuring boxing fan Ryan O'Neal and Farrah Fawcett raised $70,000 to finance DeWit's training. At this point Snatic began importing professional sparring partners from the United States.

1984 Olympics

At the 1984 Los Angeles Olympics deWit lost the gold medal match in the heavyweight division to Henry Tillman of the United States. Heading into the Olympic Games, deWit and fellow Canadian Shawn O'Sullivan were considered favorites, particularly by Canadian fans and the Canadian media. The Tillman-deWit gold medal final featured no decisive blows; however, deWit appeared to win the first two rounds against Tillman with productive work to Tillman's midsection, although Tillman clearly won the third round.  Nevertheless, Tillman won by a 5-0 decision.  Three of the five judges controversially scored every round for Tillman.  The unanimous decision startled Howard Cosell who was calling the bout for ABC Sports. "Good Lord! How do you like that?" Cosell blurted when the decision was announced.  During his post-fight interviews, Cosell informed both Tillman and deWit that he personally disagreed with the official verdict.  Tillman had also won a controversial decision in his semifinal bout, as had deWit.

Olympic results
 1st Round: bye
 Round of 16: Defeated Mohamed Bouchiche of Algeria by unanimous decision, 5–0
 Quarterfinal: Defeated Dodovic Owiny of Uganda by a first-round knockout
 Semifinal: Defeated Arnold Vanderlyde of the Netherlands by split decision, 3–2
 Final:  Lost to Henry Tillman of the United States by unanimous decision, 0–5 (was awarded silver medal)

Professional boxing career

Tabbed early as a "Great White Hope," deWit turned professional immediately, persuaded in part by a contract offer reportedly worth $1 million and began to train out of Burnet, Texas. He then defeated Ken Lakusta to capture the Canadian heavyweight championship.

A loss to Bert Cooper in 1987 was deWit's only career defeat, as he retired after six consecutive wins, the last of which being a unanimous decision victory over Henry Tillman.

Life after sport
After announcing his retirement from boxing he worked and was part owner in a concrete surfacing company in California, which he eventually left to return to Canada. A friend of his who was a judge, suggested he get an education and become a lawyer.
DeWit returned to school and graduated from the University of Alberta in 1994 with a law degree.  He was appointed Queen's Counsel (Q.C.) in 2013 and is the former president of the Canadian Bar Association Criminal Law subsection.

In 1995 deWit was inducted into the Alberta Sports Hall of Fame. He also has a street named after him in Grande Prairie, Alberta.

In 2012, deWit made a cameo appearance in the Calgary-based Souls in Rhythm band's musical video Another Round (featuring hop-hop artist Transit).

In 2017, deWit was appointed as a Justice to the Court of Queen's Bench of Alberta. He sits in Calgary.

Professional boxing record

|-
| style="text-align:center;" colspan="8"|21 Wins (14 knockouts, 7 decisions), 1 Loss (1 knockout), 1 Draw 
|-  style="text-align:center; background:#e3e3e3;"
|  style="border-style:none none solid solid; "|Result
|  style="border-style:none none solid solid; "|Record
|  style="border-style:none none solid solid; "|Opponent
|  style="border-style:none none solid solid; "|Type
|  style="border-style:none none solid solid; "|Round
|  style="border-style:none none solid solid; "|Date
|  style="border-style:none none solid solid; "|Location
|  style="border-style:none none solid solid; "|Notes
|- align=center
|Win
|
|align=left| Henry Tillman
|UD
|10
|29/03/1988
|align=left| Edmonton, Alberta
|align=left|
|-
|Win
|
|align=left| Tony "The Kid" Morrison
|UD
|10
|20/02/1988
|align=left| Centre 200, Sydney, Nova Scotia
|align=left|
|-
|Win
|
|align=left| Scott Wheaton
|UD
|10
|13/12/1987
|align=left| Calgary, Alberta
|align=left|
|-
|Win
|
|align=left| Donnie Long
|RTD
|4
|03/10/1987
|align=left| Grande Prairie, Alberta
|align=left|
|-
|Win
|
|align=left| Ken Lakusta
|KO
|5
|24/08/1987
|align=left| Northlands Agricom, Edmonton, Alberta
|align=left|
|-
|Win
|
|align=left| Terry Mims
|KO
|2
|21/05/1987
|align=left| Arco Arena, Sacramento, California
|align=left|
|-
|Loss
|
|align=left| Bert Cooper
|TKO
|2
|14/02/1987
|align=left| Regina, Saskatchewan
|align=left|
|-
|Win
|
|align=left| Lorenzo Canady
|TKO
|4
|13/12/1986
|align=left| Regina Agridome, Regina, Saskatchewan
|align=left|
|-
|Win
|
|align=left| Conroy Nelson
|TKO
|4
|10/11/1986
|align=left| Halifax Metro Centre, Halifax, Nova Scotia
|align=left|
|-
|Win
|
|align=left| Andrew Stokes
|UD
|10
|30/09/1986
|align=left| Agridome, Edmonton, Alberta
|align=left|
|-
|Win
|
|align=left| Ken Lakusta
|UD
|12
|14/06/1986
|align=left| Northlands Coliseum, Edmonton, Alberta
|align=left|
|-
|Win
|
|align=left| Mike Acey
|TKO
|3
|03/05/1986
|align=left| Regina Agridome, Regina, Saskatchewan
|align=left|
|-
|Win
|
|align=left| Jeff "Blonde Bomber" Jordan
|RTD
|4
|20/03/1986
|align=left| Stampede Corral, Calgary, Alberta
|align=left|
|-
|Win
|
|align=left| George Graham
|TKO
|2
|03/02/1986
|align=left| Northlands Agricom, Edmonton, Alberta
|align=left|
|-
|Win
|
|align=left| Scott Wheaton
|UD
|10
|13/12/1985
|align=left| Stampede Corral, Calgary, Alberta
|align=left|
|-
|Win
|
|align=left| Otis Bates
|KO
|3
|03/10/1985
|align=left| Austin, Texas
|align=left|
|-
|Win
|
|align=left| Marion Bridges
|TKO
|2
|11/09/1985
|align=left| Trump Plaza Hotel and Casino, Atlantic City, New Jersey
|align=left|
|-
|Win
|
|align=left| Earl Lewis
|TKO
|3
|11/07/1985
|align=left| Trump Plaza Hotel and Casino, Atlantic City, New Jersey
|align=left|
|-
|Win
|
|align=left| Sterling Benjamin
|UD
|6
|05/06/1985
|align=left| Resorts Casino Hotel, Atlantic City, New Jersey
|align=left|
|-
|Draw
|
|align=left| Alex Williamson
|PTS
|6
|15/04/1985
|align=left| Caesars Palace, Las Vegas, Nevada
|align=left|
|-
|Win
|
|align=left| Tony Pelu
|KO
|2
|05/03/1985
|align=left| Dallas Convention Center Arena, Dallas, Texas
|align=left|
|-
|Win
|
|align=left| Inoke Katoa
|TKO
|4
|24/01/1985
|align=left| Showboat Hotel and Casino, Las Vegas, Nevada
|align=left|
|-
|Win
|
|align=left| Walter E.M. Morris
|TKO
|2
|01/12/1984
|align=left| Northlands Coliseum, Edmonton, Alberta
|align=left|

References

External links
 deWit's Calgary Law Firm
 Willie deWit at The Canadian Encyclopedia
 
Canadian Olympic Committee
From Canada, a New Image For Boxing in Willie deWit by Michael Katz

1961 births
Living people
Boxers at the 1984 Summer Olympics
Heavyweight boxers
Sportspeople from Alberta
Olympic boxers of Canada
Olympic silver medalists for Canada
People from Kneehill County
Lawyers in Alberta
Commonwealth Games gold medallists for Canada
Boxers at the 1982 Commonwealth Games
Olympic medalists in boxing
Canadian male boxers
Medalists at the 1984 Summer Olympics
Commonwealth Games medallists in boxing
Alberta Sports Hall of Fame inductees
Medallists at the 1982 Commonwealth Games